"I'll Take You There" is a song written by Al Bell (using his real name Alvertis Isbell), and originally performed by soul/gospel family band the Staple Singers.  The Staple Singers version, produced by Bell, was released on Stax Records in February 1972, and spent a total of 15 weeks on the charts and reached #1 on the Billboard Hot 100.  It is ranked as the 19th biggest American hit of 1972.

The song was also a significant chart hit in two later cover versions.  A 1991 cover version by BeBe & CeCe Winans, with Mavis Staples featured as a guest artist, made it to #1 on the R&B chart, and also reached #90 on the Hot 100.  In 1994, the British band General Public released a cover of "I'll Take You There" which peaked at #22 on the Hot 100. Rap trio Salt-N-Pepa sampled "I'll Take You There" in their 1991 hit "Let's Talk About Sex".

Original Staple Singers version
Included on the group's 1972 album Be Altitude: Respect Yourself, "I'll Take You There" features lead singer Mavis Staples inviting her listeners to seek Heaven. The song is "almost completely a call-and-response chorus",[] with the introduction and bassline being lifted -- uncredited -- from "The Liquidator", a 1969 reggae hit written by Harry Johnson and performed by the Harry J Allstars.  In fact, the entire song, written in the key of C, contains but two chords, C and F.  A large portion of the song is set aside for Mavis' sisters Cleotha and Yvonne and their father "Pops" to seemingly perform solos on their respective instruments. In actuality, these solos (and all music in the song) were recorded by the
Muscle Shoals Rhythm Section.  When Mavis Staples says "Daddy, now, Daddy, Daddy"  (referring to "Pop's" guitar solo), it is actually Eddie Hinton who performs the solo on the record.  Muscle Shoals Rhythm Section bass player David Hood performs the song's bassline. Terry Manning added harmonica and lead electric guitar. Roger Hawkins played drums, Barry Beckett was on Wurlitzer electronic piano, and Jimmy Johnson and Raymond Banks contributed guitar parts.  The horn and string parts were arranged by Detroit arranger Johnny Allen. The horns and strings were recorded at Artie Fields Recording Studios in Detroit Michigan.

Quite a few Staple Singers songs reference civil rights and social conditions.  Many people interpret this song as describing an imagined world in which the civil rights movement has succeeded: "No more smilin' faces/lyin' to the races."

Rolling Stone editor David Fricke described this song as the "epitome of the Muscle Shoals Sound".  It was recorded in Sheffield, AL at the famous Muscle Shoals Sound Studios, and overdubbed and mixed at Ardent Studios in Memphis by Engineer Terry Manning.

Bolstered by a "feel-good" vibe, "I'll Take You There" peaked at #1 on the Billboard R&B Singles chart for four weeks May 1972. In June, "I'll Take You There" reached the top of the Billboard Hot 100 for one week. Billboard ranked it as the #19 song for 1972. The song, ranked #276 on the Rolling Stone list of the 500 Greatest Songs of All Time and inducted into the Grammy Hall of Fame in 1999, remains the most successful and recognizable single of the Staples' half-century-long career.

Chart history

Weekly charts

Year-end charts

Cover recordings
In 1991, the song returned to #1 on the R&B chart when it was covered by BeBe & CeCe Winans, with Mavis Staples featured as a guest artist on the track.  The single also made #90 on the Hot 100.

In 1994, the British band General Public released a cover of "I'll Take You There" featured in the film Threesome. It peaked at #22 on the weekly Billboard Hot 100 chart and #95 on its year-end chart. It also peaked at #38 on the year-end chart of Canadian RPM Top Singles. This version features an added toasted verse specific to this rendition.

In 2005, Sammy Hagar and The Waboritas released a cover titled "Let Me Take You There" as the first single from their 2006 album Livin' It Up!

See also
 List of number-one R&B singles of 1972 (U.S.)
 List of Hot 100 number-one singles of 1972 (U.S.)
 List of number-one R&B singles of 1991 (U.S.)
 List of number-one dance singles of 1994 (U.S.)

References

1972 singles
1994 singles
2005 singles
The Staple Singers songs
Billboard Hot 100 number-one singles
Cashbox number-one singles
Grammy Hall of Fame Award recipients
General Public songs
Funk songs
Stax Records singles
1972 songs
Songs written by Al Bell
Epic Records singles